Rianna Tei Valdes (born 3 September 1996) is an American tennis player.

Valdes has a career-high WTA singles ranking of 498, achieved on 11 May 2015. She also has a career-high WTA doubles ranking of 328, set on 28 July 2022.

Valdes won her first ITF title at the 2019 Thoreau Tennis Open in the doubles draw partnering Angela Kulikov.

She played college tennis at the University of Southern California.

ITF finals

Doubles: 3 (1 title, 2 runner-ups)

References

External links
 
 

1996 births
Living people
American female tennis players
Sportspeople from Boca Raton, Florida
USC Trojans women's tennis players
Tennis people from Florida